Tang-e Vard (also known as Āb-e Sang Āb and Āb Sangāb) is a village in Tashan-e Gharbi Rural District, Tashan District, Behbahan County, Khuzestan Province, Iran. At the 2006 census, its population was 79, in 13 families.

References 

Populated places in Behbahan County